Sirana (also known as Sirana de Odienné) is a village in northwestern Ivory Coast. It is in the sub-prefecture of Odienné, Odienné Department, Kabadougou Region, Denguélé District. At the west end of the village is a border crossing with Guinea.

Sirana was a commune until March 2012, when it became one of 1126 communes nationwide that were abolished.

Notes

Former communes of Ivory Coast
Populated places in Denguélé District
Guinea–Ivory Coast border crossings
Populated places in Kabadougou